Antoš Frolka (13 June 1877 – 8 June 1935), was a Czech painter of folk scenes.

Biography
Frolka was born in Kněždub in South Moravia. From a  poor family, he was partly self-taught, and partly taught by Joža Uprka. He tried and failed to study at the Academy of Fine Arts in Prague, spent some time at the Academy of Fine Arts in Vienna and the academy in Munich. In 1907 he joined the Association of Moravian Artists. In 1914 he received a scholarship to study in Paris, but had to abandon this after six months at the outbreak of the World War I. Mobilized and sent to the Eastern Front, Frolka experienced a severe crisis of creativity after the end of the war.

Paintings
Frolka's painting was devoted to the "small moments of everyday life" and to the folk culture of Moravia and Slovakia. He dressed always in Moravian costume and spoke in Moravian dialect. He became widely known as a painter of the Czech and Slovak national revival.

References

Bibliography

Dušan Holý and Ludmila Holá, Antoš Frolka: Mezi paletou a písní. O malíři Frolkovi a jeho rodině. Brno : Host, 2000. .
Jiří Pajer, Antoš Frolka: reprodukované malířské dílo. Strážnice : Nakladatelství Etnos, 2010. .

1877 births
1935 deaths
People from Hodonín District
People from the Margraviate of Moravia
20th-century Czech painters
Czech male painters
20th-century Czech male artists
Austro-Hungarian painters
Czechoslovak painters